The Allied occupation of Iceland during World War II began with a British invasion intent on occupying and denying Iceland to Germany. The military operation, codenamed Operation Fork, was conducted by the Royal Navy and Royal Marines. In time, some of the British garrison was replaced by Canadian and later American forces, despite the fact that the United States was not yet in the war.

Invasion

The invasion of Iceland was a British military operation conducted by the Royal Navy and Royal Marines during World War II to occupy and deny Iceland to Germany. At the start of the war, Britain imposed strict export controls on Icelandic goods, preventing profitable shipments to Germany, as part of its naval blockade. Britain offered assistance to Iceland, seeking cooperation "as a belligerent and an ally", but Reykjavik declined and reaffirmed its neutrality. The German diplomatic presence in Iceland, along with the island's strategic importance, alarmed the British. On 9 April 1940, Germany occupied Denmark, whose monarch was still the Icelandic head of state. After failing to persuade the Icelandic government to join the Allies, the British invaded on the morning of 10 May. The initial force of 746 British Royal Marines commanded by Colonel Robert Sturges disembarked at the capital Reykjavík. Meeting no resistance, the troops moved quickly to disable communication networks, secure strategic locations, and arrest German citizens. Requisitioning local transport, the troops moved to Hvalfjörður, Kaldaðarnes, Sandskeið, and Akranes to secure landing areas against the possibility of a German counterattack.

On the evening of 10 May, the government of Iceland issued a protest, charging that its neutrality had been flagrantly violated and its independence infringed, noting that compensation would be expected for all damage done. The British promised compensation, favourable business agreements, non-interference in Icelandic affairs, and the withdrawal of all forces at the end of the war. Resigning themselves to the situation, the Icelandic authorities provided the invasion force with de facto cooperation, though formally maintaining a policy of neutrality. In the following days air defence equipment was deployed in Reykjavík and a detachment of troops sent to Akureyri. However, the initial invasion force was ill-equipped, only partially trained and insufficient to the task of occupation and defence of the island. On 17 May, 4,000 additional troops of the British Army arrived to relieve the marines. In July elements of the 2nd Canadian Division and 3rd Canadian Division were landed. Commonwealth occupation forces eventually totalled 25,000 infantry with support elements from the Royal Air Force, Royal Navy and Royal Canadian Navy. One year after the invasion, military forces from the still officially neutral United States were stationed on the island by agreement with the Icelandic government, relieving the bulk of British ground forces. U.S. forces grew considerably after the U.S. entered the war on 11 December 1941, reaching up to 30,000 Army (including Air Force personnel) and Navy personnel at any one time. The RAF and RCAF continued to operate from two Royal Air Force stations through to the end of the war.

Occupation

British occupation
Under Brigadier George Lammie, Alabaster Force was formed to permanently occupy Iceland and fortify the island's defence. On 17 May 1940, the British 146th Infantry Brigade, arrived to relieve the Royal Marine invasion force, who left 19 May. Stretched thin, Brigadier Lammie requested additional forces of the HQ of the 49th (West Riding) Infantry Division, a Territorial Army (TA) formation under Major-General Henry Curtis, and the 147th Brigade arrived on 26 May, followed by numerous convoys of troops and supplies.
Elements based in Akureyri formed the Tactical School, Winter Warfare Course which trained the 49th into a Mountain/Arctic division. Additional reinforcements over the course of the summer included field artillery, Anti-Aircraft guns, Bren carriers, engineer and construction units, and support forces. The final British ground reinforcements, an infantry battalion and artillery battery, arrived in June 1941. By July 1941, there were over 25,000 British troops on the island.

Construction of airfields (including what became Reykjavík Airport), harbours, roads and other facilities began immediately. Hvalfjörður became a naval base for merchant escort and antisubmarine forces, with extensive facilities including a mine depot, pier and jetties, accommodation, a fresh water system, ammunition storage, a fleet bakery, bulk naval storage warehouse, recreation facilities, a direction-finding station and a fuel farm. The facility was protected by a minefield, anti-submarine gate and boom across the fjord, coastal guns, AA batteries, and anti-submarine trawlers. The Royal Navy Fleet Air Arm 701 Squadron provided initial air support, and the army built two airfields, RAF Kaldadarnes and RAF Reykjavik, home to several RAF and RCAF squadrons until the end of the war. As naval base facilities grew Coastal Command aircraft were stationed for patrol, reconnaissance, and antisubmarine duties. Two hospitals were also built, No. 50 General Hospital was built at Reykjavik and operated from June 1940 to March 1942. After this it became the RAF No. 11 General Hospital, and operated until 1946 with RAF personnel. No. 30 General Hospital operated from July 1940 to September 1941.

At the end of hostilities most British facilities were turned over to the Icelandic government. 199 Commonwealth soldiers are buried in Iceland in six cemeteries cared for by the Commonwealth War Graves Commission.

British Army
 49th (West Riding) Infantry Division
 70th Infantry Brigade
 10th Battalion, Durham Light Infantry
 11th Battalion, Durham Light Infantry
 1st Battalion, Tyneside Scottish
 147th Infantry Brigade
 1/6th Battalion, Duke of Wellington's Regiment
 1/7th Battalion, Duke of Wellington's Regiment
 1/5th Battalion, West Yorkshire Regiment
 146th Infantry Brigade
 4th Battalion, Lincolnshire Regiment
 1/4th Battalion, King's Own Yorkshire Light Infantry
 Hallamshire Battalion, York and Lancaster Regiment
 Divisional Troops
 2nd Battalion, Princess Louise's Kensington Regiment
 69th (West Riding) Field Regiment, Royal Artillery
 143rd (Kent Yeomanry) Field Regiment, Royal Artillery
 294th Field Company, Royal Engineers
 756th Field Company, Royal Engineers
 757th Field Company, Royal Engineers
 289th Field Park Company, Royal Engineers
 23rd Bridging Platoon, Royal Engineers
 49th (West Riding) Divisional Signals, Royal Corps of Signals

Royal Navy
 
 
 
 
 
 
 HMS Lancashire
 
 
 
 
 HMT Franconia
 HMT Lancastria
 
 
 HMHS Leinster

Royal Air Force
 No. 48 Squadron
 No. 53 Squadron
 No. 86 Squadron
 No. 98 Squadron
 No. 120 Squadron
 No. 204 Squadron
 No. 209 Squadron
 No. 210 Squadron
 No. 221 Squadron
 No. 269 Squadron
 No. 279 Squadron
 No. 280 Squadron
 No. 330 Squadron
 No. 612 (County of Aberdeen) Squadron
 No. 1407 (Meteorological) Flight
 RAF No. 11 General Hospital

Canadian occupation

 

On 18 May 1940, Britain requested Canada to garrison and defend Iceland with the 2nd Canadian Division, along with air force, anti-air, shore battery and coastal defence elements. The remainder of the 2,659 man "Z" Force, comprising Les Fusiliers Mont-Royal, The Cameron Highlanders of Ottawa (M.G.), a brigade signal section and details, arrived on 9 July. Canadian forces dispersed across the island and initiated work on defence positions, and preparations for the building of the aerodrome in Kaldaðarnes, building roads, improving harbours, establishing guard over strategic assets, and setting up coast watch stations. On 9 February 1941, Canadian forces engaged a single German aircraft overflying the island.

Owing to pressing needs elsewhere including Canadian commitments to the defence of Britain, and to providing garrison troops in the West Indies, it was agreed to redeploy Canadian forces. Force headquarters and The Royal Regiment sailed for England on 31 October and rejoined the main body of the 2nd Canadian Division. The Camerons, who had been allotted to the 3rd Division, spent the winter on the island and departed for England on 28 April 1941. They were temporarily replaced by British garrison forces, until 7 July 1941, when the defence of Iceland was transferred from Britain to the (still officially neutral) United States, by agreement with Iceland. Canadian army, navy and air force units were dispatched to and continued to operate in and around Iceland throughout the war. No. 162 Squadron RCAF was seconded to RAF Coastal Command and stationed at RAF Reykjavik from January 1944 to cover the mid-ocean portion of the North Atlantic shipping route. Aircraft from this squadron attacked two U-boats in 1944, sinking  on 17 April 1944.

Canadian Army
 4th Canadian Infantry Brigade
 The Royal Regiment of Canada infantry battalion
 Les Fusiliers Mont-Royal infantry battalion
 The Cameron Highlanders of Ottawa infantry battalion

Royal Canadian Navy
 
 
 

Merchant Navy
 
 
 
 Stonepool
 Dracola
 Yearwood

Royal Canadian Air Force
 No. 162 Squadron RCAF
 RCAF Marine Craft Beaver
 RCAF Marine Craft Eskimo

United States occupation

Britain needed her troops elsewhere and requested that US forces occupy the island. The US agreed on 16 June 1941. The 1st Provisional Marine Brigade of 194 officers and 3,714 men from San Diego under the command of Brigadier-General John Marston sailed from Charleston, South Carolina, on 22 June to assemble as Task Force 19 (TF 19) at Argentia, Newfoundland: TF 19 sailed on 1 July. Britain failed to persuade the Althing to approve an American occupation force, but with TF 19 anchored off Reykjavík that evening Roosevelt gave approval for the invasion. The United States Marine Corps commenced landing on 8 July, and disembarkation was completed on 12 July. On 6 August, the United States Navy established Naval Air Station Keflavik at Reykjavík with the arrival of Patrol Squadron VP-73 PBY Catalinas and VP-74 PBM Mariners. United States Army personnel began arriving in Iceland in August.

US Marines
 1st Provisional Marine Brigade (BG John Marston)
 5th Defense Battalion
 6th Marine Regiment (United States)
 1st Battalion 6th Marines
 2nd Battalion 6th Marines
 3rd Battalion 6th Marines
 2nd Battalion 10th Marines
 A Company of the 2nd Tank Battalion
 A Company of the 2nd Service Battalion

US Army
 5th Infantry Division (MG Charles H. Bonesteel Jr.)
 Division Headquarters
 2nd Infantry Regiment
 10th Infantry Regiment
 11th Infantry Regiment
 5th Division Artillery
 19th Field Artillery Battalion, (18x 105mm Howitzers)
 46th Field Artillery Battalion, (18x 105mm Howitzers)
 50th Field Artillery Battalion, (18x 105mm Howitzers)
 21st Field Artillery Battalion, (18x 155mm Howitzers)
 7th Combat Engineer Battalion
 5th Reconnaissance Troop (Mechanized)
 5th Medical Battalion
 Special Troops
 705th Ordnance Light Maintenance Company
 5th Quartermaster Company
 5th Signal Company
 Military Police Platoon
 Band
 61st Coast Artillery

US Navy
Naval Operating Base Iceland (RADM James L. Kauffman)
 
 
 
 
 
 
 
 
 
 
 
 
 
 
 
 
 
 
 
 
 
 
 
 
 
 VP-73 (United States Navy)

US Army Air Force
 33rd Pursuit Squadron
 24th Special Operations Wing

Outcome

Britain invaded to forestall a German occupation, to provide a base for naval and air patrols, and to protect merchant shipping lanes from North America to Europe. In this the invasion and occupation was successful. However, the presence of British, Canadian, and US troops had a lasting impact on the country. 

In some years this equaled 25% of the population or almost 50% of the native male population. The troops outnumbered the group of Icelandic marriageable females.

Some point to the subsequent economic revival, others to loss of sovereignty and social upheaval. The occupation required the building of a network of roads, hospitals, harbours, airfields and bridges across the country, and this did have enormous positive economic impact. On the other hand, Icelanders severely censured the sexual relationships between troops and local women, which were causing considerable controversy and political turmoil. In 1941, the Icelandic Minister of the Judiciary investigated "The Situation", and the police tracked more than 500 women who had been having sex with the soldiers. Many were upset that the foreign troops were "taking away" women, friends, and family. In 1942 two facilities opened to house such women who slept with the soldiers. Both closed within a year, after investigations determined that most liaisons were consensual. About 332 Icelandic women married foreign soldiers.

During the occupation, on 17 June 1944, Iceland declared itself a republic, and while continuing to cooperate with the British, Canadian, and American military they remained officially neutral throughout the war. As the war drew to a close the Keflavík Agreement signed in 1946 between the United States and the Republic of Iceland stipulated that the American army would leave the country within six months, and Iceland would take possession of the Keflavík Airport. This did not happen for many decades and a substantial US military presence remained in Iceland until 30 September 2006.

Although the British action was to forestall any risk of a German invasion, there is no evidence that the Germans had an invasion planned. There was however German interest in seizing Iceland. In a postwar interview with an American, Walter Warlimont claimed, "Hitler definitely was interested in occupying Iceland prior to [British] occupation. In the first place, he wanted to prevent 'anyone else' from coming there; and, in the second place, he also wanted to use Iceland as an air base for the protection of our submarines operating in that area". After the British invasion, the Germans drew up a report to examine the feasibility of seizing Iceland, Operation Ikarus. The report found that while an invasion could be successful, maintaining supply lines would be too costly and the benefits of holding Iceland would not outweigh the costs (there was, for instance, insufficient infrastructure for aircraft in Iceland).

See also
 Ástandið
 Invasion of Iceland
 Iceland in World War II
 British occupation of the Faroe Islands
 Expansion operations and planning of the Axis Powers
 Battle of the Atlantic
 Occupation of Greenland

Notes

References

Further reading

External links 
 Address by Markús Örn Antonsson (Icelandic Ambassador to Canada), 21 October 2006.
 "Franklin D. Roosevelt's message to Congress on the US occupation of Iceland", U.S. State Department (7 July 1941).

1940 in Iceland
Iceland
Articles containing video clips
Battle of the Atlantic
Iceland
Iceland
Conflicts in 1940
Iceland in World War II
Invasions by the United Kingdom
Invasions of Iceland
History of the Royal Marines
Military history of Iceland during World War II
Iceland
Iceland
World War II operations of the Western European Theatre
Military history of Canada during World War II
Iceland
Military history of the United Kingdom during World War II